Felipe Valencia (born March 1, 2005) is an American soccer player who plays as a forward for MLS side Inter Miami.

Career

Fort Lauderdale CF
Valencia made his league debut for the club on August 8, 2020, in a 2–1 away victory over Tormenta FC. On August 19, 2020, he scored his first professional goal against North Texas SC in a 3–2 home victory. At the age of 15 years, five months, 18 days, Valencia became the youngest goalscorer in USL history, surpassing the record previously set by Alphonso Davies.

Inter Miami
On December 18, 2020, it was announced that Valencia would join Inter Miami in 2021 as their first ever homegrown player.

References

External links
Felipe Valencia at US Soccer Development Academy

2005 births
Living people
Footballers from Cali
Colombian footballers
American soccer players
Colombian emigrants to the United States
Inter Miami CF II players
Inter Miami CF players
USL League One players
Soccer players from Florida
Association football forwards
Homegrown Players (MLS)